Wesley Gordon (born July 14, 1994) is an American professional basketball player for Trefl Sopot of the Polish Basketball League. He played college basketball for Colorado Buffaloes from 2012 until 2017. Gordon entered the 2017 NBA draft, but he was not selected in the draft's two rounds.

High school career
Gordon attended Sierra High School in Colorado Springs, Colorado. As a senior, he led Sierra to the state title game, falling to Josh Scott-led Lewis-Palmer High School. Gordon signed with Colorado out of high school.

College career
Gordon played four seasons with Colorado Buffaloes, where he averaged 6.6 points, 6.7 rebounds, 1.3 assists and 1.6 blocks per game. He redshirted his freshman year before averaging 5.9 points and 6.0 rebounds per game as a redshirt freshman. He was the second player in the history of his university to achieve more than 200 caps, achieving 204, only being behind by David Harrison, who achieved 225 between 2001 and 2004. It is also the eighth-best mark in the history of the Pac-12 Conference.

Professional career

Panthers Fürstenfeld
After going undrafted in the 2017 NBA draft, Gordon signed with the Austrian club Panthers Fürstenfeld in October 2017. During his first season, he led the league in blocks and was one of the top rebounders of the league.

Soproni KC
For the next season, he joined Soproni KC of the Hungarian League. He led the league in both blocks and rebounds per game.

Rethymno Cretan Kings
On July 9, 2019, Gordon joined Rethymno Cretan Kings of the Greek Basket League. He averaged  8.1 points, 6.8 rebounds and 1.3 blocks per game.

Le Portel
On July 9, 2020, Gordon signed with ESSM Le Portel of the French LNB Pro A.

Trefl Sopot
On July 22, 2022, he has signed with Trefl Sopot of the Polish Basketball League.

References

External links
RealGM.com Profile
Eurobasket.com Profile
Colorado Buffaloes bio

1994 births
Living people
American expatriate basketball people in Austria
American expatriate basketball people in Greece
American expatriate basketball people in Hungary
Basketball players from Colorado Springs, Colorado
ESSM Le Portel players
Centers (basketball)
Colorado Buffaloes men's basketball players
Larisa B.C. players
Rethymno B.C. players
Soproni KC players
Trefl Sopot players